Edward Davison may refer to:

Edward Davison (poet) (1898–1970), Scottish poet and critic
Edward Doran Davison (1819–1894), lumber merchant and political figure in Nova Scotia

See also
 Edward Davidson (disambiguation)